WORV (1580 AM, "Heartbeat of the Hub City") is a radio station broadcasting a religious format. Licensed to Hattiesburg, Mississippi, United States, the station serves the Laurel-Hattiesburg area. The station is currently owned by Circuit Broadcasting Co.

References

External links

ORV
Hattiesburg, Mississippi